Refusenik is a 2007 documentary film by Laura Bialis that chronicles the struggle of Jews to emigrate from the Soviet Union in the 1960s and 1970s. A former refusenik, Natan Sharansky, appears in the film.

Critical reception
The Village Voice calls it an "absorbing portrait of the refusenik movement." The New York Sun says that it is "a thorough and engaging nonfiction account of the plight of Soviet Jews systematically oppressed under communism as they had been under the tsars, and denied the right to emigrate to Israel once the Jewish state was formed in 1948."

References

External links

2007 films
American documentary films
Documentary films about politics
Documentary films about Jews and Judaism
Documentary films about human rights
Documentary films about the Soviet Union
Jews and Judaism in the Soviet Union
Documentary films about immigration
2000s English-language films
2000s American films
Soviet Jewry movement